Mirco Di Tora (born 19 May 1986) is a male Italian swimmer.

Di Tora is an athlete of the Gruppo Sportivo Fiamme Oro.

Biography
In 2012 Mirco Di Tora qualified for his second Olympic appearance in London 2012. He is a former Italian record-holder in the 50 and 100 metres backstroke.

Achievements

See also
Italy at the 2012 Summer Olympics - Swimming

References

External links
 
Swimmer profile at CONI website

1986 births
Living people
Italian male swimmers
Italian male backstroke swimmers
Swimmers at the 2008 Summer Olympics
Swimmers at the 2012 Summer Olympics
Olympic swimmers of Italy
European Aquatics Championships medalists in swimming
Sportspeople from Ferrara
Mediterranean Games bronze medalists for Italy
Swimmers at the 2009 Mediterranean Games
Mediterranean Games medalists in swimming
Swimmers of Fiamme Oro
21st-century Italian people